The Jennings Formation is a geologic formation in Maryland. It preserves fossils dating back to the Devonian period.

See also

 List of fossiliferous stratigraphic units in Maryland
 Paleontology in Maryland

References

Additional sources
 

Devonian Maryland
Devonian geology of Pennsylvania
Devonian southern paleotemperate deposits